Article 2 of the Constitution of the Democratic Republic of the Congo divides the country into the capital city of Kinshasa and 25 named provinces. It also gives the capital the status of a province.  Therefore, in many contexts Kinshasa is regarded as the 26th province.

List

History 
When Belgium annexed the Belgian Congo as a colony in November 1908, it was initially organised into 22 districts. Ten western districts were administered directly by the main colonial government, while the eastern part of the colony was administered under two vice-governments: eight northeastern districts formed Orientale Province, and four southeastern districts formed Katanga. In 1919, the colony was organised into four provinces:
 Congo-Kasaï (five southwestern districts),
 Équateur (five northwestern districts),
 Orientale Province and Katanga (previous vice-governments).
In 1932, the colony was reorganised into six provinces. Initially they were named after their capital cities, but in 1947 regional names were adopted.

The Belgian Congo became an independent country in 1960, named Republic of the Congo. By 1963, the country was organised into 21 provinces (informally called provincettes) plus the capital city of Léopoldville, similar to the original 22 districts under colonial rule. In 1966, the 21 provincettes were grouped into eight provinces, and the capital city was renamed Kinshasa.

In 1971, the country was renamed Zaire, and three provinces were also renamed. In 1975, the capital city of Kinshasa obtained the status of a province. In 1988, the province of Kivu was split into three. In 1997, the country was renamed Democratic Republic of the Congo, and the three provinces that had been renamed in 1971 either retook their previous name or took another.

Article 2 of the Constitution of the Democratic Republic of the Congo, adopted in 2006, specifies a territorial organisation into 26 provinces, again resembling the previous provincettes and original colonial districts. The reorganisation was scheduled to take effect within three years of the new constitution's promulgation, however progress was slow.
In October 2007 the Minister for Decentralisation, Denis Kalume Numbi, presented a bill for decentralisation in the National Assembly. The subsequent debate turned up a variety of issues that first had to be addressed with changes to related laws.
In an October 2010 conclave of the ruling AMP coalition, it was proposed to revise Article 226, which calls for the creation of 26 provinces out of the current 11, in order to allow more time for the transition. On 9 January 2015 the National Assembly passed a law on the new administrative divisions of the country, according to which new provinces should be installed in period of 12 months.

Maps

Approximate correspondence between historical and current provinces

See also
 History of the administrative divisions of the Democratic Republic of the Congo 
 List of provincial governors of the Democratic Republic of the Congo
 Lists of provincial governors of the Democratic Republic of the Congo
 List of provinces of the Democratic Republic of the Congo by Human Development Index
 Districts of the Democratic Republic of the Congo
 Districts of the Belgian Congo
 Territories of the Democratic Republic of the Congo
 ISO 3166-2:CD

References

Bibliography
 
 

 
Subdivisions of the Democratic Republic of the Congo
Congo, Democratic Republic of, Provinces
Congo, Democratic Republic of 1
Provinces, Congo, Democratic Republic of
Democratic Republic of the Congo geography-related lists